The Independent of Katoomba in the Blue Mountains in New South Wales began publication on Wednesday 14 May 1930.

History
The Independent was owned, published and edited by Thomas Walter Guest and printed at the offices of Joseph Bennett & Son. It began publication on Wednesday 14 May 1930, appeared weekly and circulated through Katoomba, Blackheath and Leura. It appears to have survived for just under a year.

Digitisation
The Independent has been digitised as part of the Australian Newspapers Digitisation Program project of the National Library of Australia.

See also
List of newspapers in New South Wales
List of newspapers in Australia

References

External links
 

Defunct newspapers published in Katoomba, New South Wales
Newspapers on Trove